María Georgina Quitral Espinoza, commonly known as Rayén Quitral (7 November 1916 – 20 October 1979), was a Chilean soprano of Mapuche-Picunche origin. Known internationally for her interpretation of the Queen of the Night in the opera The Magic Flute, she was also made famous by her appearances dressed in Mapuche outfits, displaying her pride in her indigenous roots.

Biography 

Rayén Quitral was born in Iloca, a coastal village in the commune of Licantén, in the Province of Curicó, Maule Region. She studied singing in her country and made her debut in the Central Theatre of Santiago in 1937. In 1941, she debuted at the Colón Theatre of Buenos Aires, in the role of the Queen of the Night in the opera The Magic Flute.   She made appearances in various countries in the Americas, later residing for a long period in Mexico.

In Chile, she sang Lucia de Lammermoor in 1942 and performed as Gilda in Rigoletto in 1943.   In 1950, she conducted a concert tour of Italy and France, as well as debuting in London with great success in 1951, once again with The Magic Flute, which led her to make an appearance at Buckingham Palace.

In 1967, she retired from the music business. She dedicated her final years to teaching lyrical singing to young people of limited means. On 19 September 1972, the government of Chile awarded her a gratuitous pension. Rayén Quitral died in Santiago on 20 October 1979.

References

1916 births
1979 deaths
Chilean people of Mapuche descent
Chilean operatic sopranos
20th-century women opera singers